Brynteg is a crossroads village and post town on the Isle of Anglesey, North Wales. It is part of the community of Llanfair-Mathafarn-Eithaf.

Description
Brynteg is located on the east of the island on the B5108 and B5110 roads due west of the coastal resort of Benllech.

During October 2013 the residents of Brynteg were invited to vote for changing the name of the village to Rhosfawr. The results of this vote was 19 for the proposal and 34 against.

In 2014, Brynteg was rated one of the most attractive postcode areas to live in Wales.

Governance
Prior to the Isle of Anglesey (Electoral Arrangements) Order 2012 Brynteg gave its name to an electoral ward of the island's county council. The population of this ward taken at the 2011 Census was 1,869. The ward subsequently became part of the new multi-councillor ward of Lligwy.

Notable people
Howel Harris Hughes (1873–1956), theologian, Presbyterian minister and Principal of the United Theological College in Aberystwyth was born in the village.

See also
Storws Wen Golf Club

References

Llanfair-Mathafarn-Eithaf
Villages in Anglesey
Former wards of Anglesey